Bill Meyer Stadium was a baseball field located in Knoxville, Tennessee. Originally known as Knoxville Municipal Stadium when it opened in 1953, it was later renamed after Billy Meyer (1892–1957), a Knoxville native who was a catcher and manager in Major League Baseball and a longtime minor league skipper.

Baseball usage
It was used by minor league baseball teams, most recently the Knoxville Smokies, an AA Minor League Baseball team.  It had a capacity of 6,400 people. The stadium was closed in 1999 after the team moved to a new stadium near Sevierville. The stands were demolished, and bleachers with capacity for about 100 people were installed. The stadium is now called Neal Ridley/Todd Helton Field and is used as a venue for amateur baseball games.

Football usage
In the early part of the 1970s, Bill Meyer Stadium was converted into a Pop Warner recreational football league facility. The 100 yard field was striped from the third base side of the diamond, extending out to the right field warning track area. A great majority of the football plays were snapped from the dirt area of the infield. It became the home field for the Fraternal Order of Police (FOP) midget (11- to 12-year-old) football team which held daily practices throughout the fall in the dirt parking area outside the stadium.

References

External links
 at MinorLeagueBallparks.com
Knoxville Smokies at Great American Baseball Trips
Bill Meyer Stadium, Knoxville, Tennessee at BallParkReviews.com
 at DigitalBallparks.com

,

High school baseball venues in the United States
Sports venues in Knoxville, Tennessee
Baseball venues in Tennessee
1953 establishments in Tennessee
Sports venues completed in 1953
American football venues in Tennessee
Defunct baseball venues in the United States
Defunct minor league baseball venues
Defunct American football venues in the United States
Minor league baseball venues